Lingbo is a locality situated in Ockelbo Municipality, Gävleborg County, Sweden with 429 inhabitants in 2010.

References 

Populated places in Ockelbo Municipality
Hälsingland